Taniyama Station (谷山駅) is the name of two train stations in Japan:

 Taniyama Station (JR Kyushu)
 Taniyama Station (Kagoshima Municipal Tramway)